

English language

1800s 

Encyclopaedia Londinensis (1801)
The Cyclopædia; or, Universal Dictionary of Arts, Sciences, and Literature  ed. Abraham Rees (1802–1819)
Domestic Encyclopedia (1802)
English Encyclopaedia (1802)
Kendal's Pocket Encyclopedia (1802, second edition 1811)
Minor Encyclopedia (1803), edited by Thaddeus M. Harris, in the United States; copies much of Kendal's Pocket Encyclopedia
Encyclopædia Perthensis (Perth, Scotland, 1803; 1816)
The New and Complete American Encyclopædia or Universal Dictionary of Arts and Sciences (1805-1811)
A Dictionary of Arts and Sciences (1806-7)
Edinburgh Encyclopædia (1808–1830)
British Encyclopedia, or Dictionary of Arts and Sciences (1809)

1810s 

The imperial encyclopaedia, or, Dictionary of the sciences and arts : comprehending also the whole circle of miscellaneous literature by Thomas Exley and William Moore Johnson (1812)
Pantologia (1813)
Encyclopedia mancuniensis (1815) (Link contains Vol. 2)
Modern Encyclopaedia edited by Amyas Deane Burrowes (1816)
Encyclopædia Metropolitana (1817)

1820s 

Encyclopædia Edinensis (1827)
Oxford Encyclopedia (1828) (Link contains Vols. 4 and 5)
London Encyclopaedia (1829)
Encyclopaedia Americana (1829–1833), 13 volumes, editor Francis Lieber.
Cabinet Cyclopedia (1829)

1830s 
Maunder's Treasury of Knowledge and Library of Reference (1830)
Treasury of Knowledge and Library of Reference (1833)
British Cyclopaedia of the Arts and Sciences (1833)
Penny Cyclopaedia (1833–1846)
National Cyclopaedia of Useful Knowledge (1847)
National Cyclopedia (1867)
Imperial Cyclopaedia (1850)
English Cyclopaedia (1854–1862, supp. 1869–1873), later served as the basis for the Everyman's Encyclopaedia (1913)
Chambers's Information for the People (1835)

1840s 
Popular Encyclopedia or Conversations Lexicon (1841)
New Popular Encyclopedia (1901)
Modern Cyclopedia of Universal Knowledge (1906)
Blackie's Modern Cyclopaedia of Universal Information  (1889) (link contains Vols. 1-3, 5)
New Cabinet Cyclopedia and Treasury of Knowledge (1891) American ed.
New National Cyclopedia and Treasury (1899)
XXth century Cyclopaedia and Atlas (1901)
New Twentieth Century Cyclopaedia (1903)
New and Complete Universal Self-Pronouncing Dictionary (1905)
New Cosmopolitan Encyclopaedia (1906)
National Encyclopedia of Reference (1912)
Dictionary of Science, Literature and Art (1842)

1850s 

Library of General Knowledge (1850)
Iconographic Encyclopaedia of Science, Literature and Art (1851); New and enlarged edition (1886)
Popular Educator (1852)
The Popular educator: a complete encyclopaedia (1884)
New Popular Educator (1890)
Enquire Within Upon Everything (1856)
New American Cyclopaedia (1857–1863), 16 volumes, editors George Ripley and Charles A. Dana
Annual Cyclopedia (1862; an annual supplement to the New American Cyclopeadia; renamed Appleton's Annual Cyclopedia in 1876; final edition in 1903)
American Cyclopaedia (1873–1876), the retitled New American Cyclopaedia
Family Cyclopaedia (1859)

1860s 

Chambers's Encyclopaedia (1860)
World Almanac (1868)
Whitaker's Almanack (1868)

1870s 
Zell's Popular Encyclopedia (1870)
National Encyclopedia (1873) A re-issue of Zell's
People's Encyclopedia (1873) A British abridgement of Zell's
Universal Encyclopedia (1878) A re-issue of Zell's
School Encyclopedia (1899) A re-issue of Zell's
Globe Encyclopaedia of Universal Information (1876)
Student's Encyclopaedia of Universal Knowledge (1883) A re-issue of Globe
Illustrated Globe Encyclopaedia (1890–93) An illustrated re-issue of Globe
Johnson's New Universal Cyclopaedia (1876–1878), 4 volumes; editors Frederick Augustus Porter Barnard and Arnold Henry Guyot
Johnson's (revised) universal cyclopaedia (1886)
Johnson's Universal Cyclopaedia (1893–1897)
Universal Cyclopaedia (1900) 
Encyclopedic Dictionary (1879)
Lloyd's encyclopaedic dictionary (1895) (link only contains Vols. 1-2 and 5)
International Encyclopedia and Dictionary (1900)
International dictionary and cyclopaedia (1901)
Imperial dictionary and Cyclopaedia (1901)
Beeton's dictionary of universal information (1879)
Library of Universal Knowledge (1879), a reprint of Chambers's Encyclopaedia with American additions; many editions through the 1880s
International Cyclopaedia A re-issue in 1893, many editions during the 1890s.
New International Encyclopedia (1904)

1880s 
Universal Instructor (1880)
Little Cyclopaedia of Common Things (1882)
People's Cyclopedia of Universal Knowledge (1883)
New People's Cyclopedia of Universal Knowledge 1889 re-issue (Three of four vols. in link)
Cassell's Concise Cyclopaedia (1883)
Cassell's Cabinet Encyclopedia (1904)
Peale's Popular Educator and Cyclopedia (1883)
Home Library of Useful Knowledge 1886 re-issue
Library of National Information and Popular Knowledge Vols 3-4, Vols 5-6 (1884)
Home Teacher (1886)
Cassell's Miniature Cyclopaedia (1888)
Pocket Encyclopaedia (1888)
Century Dictionary (1889)
Century Dictionary and Cyclopedia (1901)

1890s 

Ready Reference (1890)
World Wide Encyclopedia and Gazetteer (1890)
Cassell's Storehouse of General Information (1891)
Cassell's Encyclopedia of General Information (1908)
The Complete Compendium of Universal Knowledge (1891)
Ogilvie's Encyclopedia of Useful Information (1891)
Chamber's Condensed Encyclopedia (1895)
Harper's Book of Facts (1895)
Pears Cyclopaedia (1897), originally named Pears' Shilling Cyclopaedia
The People's Select Cyclopedia (1897), by Charles Nisbett
Standard Cyclopaedia (1897)
X-Rays of Intellectual Light (1899)
Standard American Book of Knowledge (1900)
World's Book of Knowledge (1901)
20th Century Book of Universal Knowledge (1901)
American Educator and Library of Knowledge (1902)
New Century Cyclopedia of Universal Knowledge (1902)
American Home Educator and Book of Universal Knowledge (1903)
Standard Library of Knowledge (1904)
Chandler's Encyclopedia (1898)
New Complete Condensed Encyclopedia (1909)
Universal Cyclopaedia and Dictionary edited by Charles Morris (1898)
International Library of Reference (1899)
Universal Reference Library (1900)
Twentieth Century Encyclopedia link goes to vols. 2, 5 and 6 (1901)
Imperial Reference Library (1901)
Columbian Cyclopaedia  (1899)
Imperial Encyclopedia and Dictionary (1903)
New Imperial Encyclopedia and Dictionary (1906)
United Editors Encyclopedia and Dictionary (1909)
United Editors Perpetual Encyclopedia (1911)
Werner's Universal Encyclopedia (1899)

Britannica 
Supplement to the third edition (1801, 1803)
Fourth edition (1810)
Fifth edition (1817)
Sixth edition (1823)
Supplement to the fifth edition, (later known as the supplement to the fourth, fifth and sixth editions) (1824)
Seventh edition (1842)
Eighth edition (1860)
Ninth edition (1889)

Arabic 
Al-Muhit al Muhit ("The ocean of oceans"), Butrus al-Bustani (1867)

Czech 
 Riegrův slovník naučný (11 volumes, 1860–1874; supplement vol. 1890. Online)
Stručný všeobecný slovník věcný (9 volumes, 1874–1885, online)
Příruční slovník všeobecných vědomostí (2 volumes, 1882–1887, editor Josef Rank, vol 1 online)
Otto's encyclopedia (Ottův slovník naučný, 28 vols., 1888–1909, 12 supplement vols., Ottův slovník naučný nové doby (incomplete), 1930–1943, volumes 1–28 online)

Danish 
 Salmonsens Konversationsleksikon (19 volumes, 1893-1911)

Dutch 
Winkler Prins Geïllustreerde Encyclopaedie (1870–1882; 2nd ed. 1884-1888)

French 
Dictionnaires généraux, universels, encyclopédiques, et autres… - a bibliography of French encyclopedias up to Larousse
Encyclopédie Méthodique (Panckoucke), 1782–1832
Encyclopédie nouvelle (Pierre Leroux and Jean Reynaud), 1839–1840
Petite Encyclopédie du jeune âge, Larousse (1853)
Grand dictionnaire universel du XIXe siècle by Pierre Larousse (17 volumes 1866–1877), really an encyclopedia despite its nameLa Grande Encyclopédie, general secretaries of the editorial board: Ferdinand-Camille Dreyfus and André Berthelot (31 volumes 1886–1902)

German Oekonomische Encyklopädie (General System of State, City, Home and Agriculture), Editor Johann Georg Krünitz (242 Volumes 1773–1858)Allgemeine Encyclopädie der Wissenschaften und Künste (Ersch–Gruber; 1818–1889, uncompleted)Brockhaus (eds. 1–14 by 1900)Pierers Universal-Lexikon (1824–1836; 7th ed. 1888–1893)Meyers Konversations-Lexikon (1839–1855; 5th ed. 1893–1897)Herders Konversations-Lexikon (1854–1857; 2nd ed. 1875–1879)

Hungarian Egyetemes magyar encyclopaedia (1859–1876) (→ hu)A Pallas Nagy Lexikona (1893–1897)

 Italian Piccola Enciclopedia (1853)Nuova Enciclopedia Italiana (1875)Enciclopedia universale illustrata (1887) by Francesco Vallardi

Japanese Gunsho Ruijū (1819)Koji Ruien (1896–1914)

 Persian Yadgar-i-Bahaduri (1834)

Polish Encyklopedia Powszechna or Encyklopedia Orgelbranda (1st Edition, 28 volumes, 1859-1868)Encyyklopedia Kościelna (33 volumes, 1873-1933)

Romanian Enciclopedia română (Editor: Constantin Diaconovich, 3 volumes, 1896–1904)

Russian 
 Plyushar's Encyclopedic Lexicon (17 volumes, 1834-1841)
 Starchevsky's Spravochny entsiklopedichesky slovar (12 volumes, 1847–55)
 Brockhaus and Efron Encyclopedic Dictionary (86 volumes, 1890-1906)
 Granat Encyclopedic Dictionary (9 volumes, 1891-1903)

 Spanish 
 Enciclopedia moderna (1851), Francisco de P. Mellado

Swedish 
 Conversations-lexicon (4 volumes, 1821-1826), a translation of Brockhaus 2nd edition
 Svenskt konversationslexikon (4 volumes, 1845-1851), by Per Gustaf Berg
 Nordisk familjebok (20 volumes, 1876–1899; 2nd ed. 1904–1926)

 Telugu Pedda Bala Siksha (1832)

Turkish 
 Kamus-ül-Ulûm ve’l-Maarif Editor Ali Suavi, 1870
 Lûgaat-i Tarihiye ve Coğrafiye Editor Ahmet Rıfat Efendi, 1881 (7 volumes)
 Sicil-i Osmani Editor Mehmet Süreyya Bey, 1890
 Kamus-ül-Alam Editor » : Şemsettin Sami, 1899 (6 volumes)

 Welsh Encyclopaedia Cambrensis (1854)

Specialist encyclopediasThe Engineer's and Mechanic's Encyclopaedia (1836/1837; 2nd ed. 1849; often cited as Hebert's Encyclopaedia)Cyclopaedia of Useful Arts and Manufactures (1852; often cited as Tomlinson's Cyclopaedia)Dictionary of Greek and Roman Antiquities (1842)Dictionary of Greek and Roman Biography and Mythology  (1870)Cyclopaedia of Political Science - Cyclopaedia of Political Science, Political Economy, and the Political History of the United States by the Best American and European Writers] (1881–1899), John J. LalorThe Cyclopedia of New Zealand (1897–1908, mainly self-published)Brewer's Dictionary of Phrase and Fable (1870)Dictionary of Political Economy (1894–1899), by Inglis PalgraveHastings' Dictionary of the Bible (1898–1904)Cyclopedia of Universal History (1880–1884), world historyRidpath's Universal History (1895), world historyBiographie universelle des musiciens et bibliographie générale de la musique, François-Joseph Fétis (1835–1844)Dictionnaire de chimie pure et appliquée, Charles-Adolphe Wurtz (1874–1878)Dictionnaire de botanique, Henri Ernest Baillon (1876–1892)Nouvelle Biographie Générale, Ferdinand Hoefer (1853–1866)Realencyclopädie der Classischen Altertumswissenschaft, "Pauly–Wissowa" (1839–1852, 2nd ed. 1890–1980)Realencyklopädie für protestantische Theologie und Kirche, Johann Jakob Herzog (1853–1868)Handbuch der Organischen Chemie, Friedrich Konrad Beilstein (1880-1882)Lexikon der gesamten Technik, Otto Lueger (1st Edition 1894–1899)Encyklopädie der mathematischen Wissenschaften, Felix Klein (1898–1933)Enzyklopädie der philosophischen Wissenschaften im Grundrisse, G. F. W. Hegel (1817)
 Diccionario geográfico, estadístico, histórico, de la isla de Cuba (1863–66)
 Military Encyclopedic Lexicon (15 volumes, 1837-1852)
 Encyclopedia of Military and Marine Sciences'' (8 volumes, 1883-1897)

See also 
History of the Encyclopædia Britannica

 
19th